Sinolaelaps is a genus of mites in the family Laelapidae.

Species
 Sinolaelaps liui Liu & Wang, 1997     
 Sinolaelaps typhlomydis Y. M. Gu & C. S. Wang, 1979     
 Sinolaelaps wuyiensis Wang, 1982     
 Sinolaelaps yunnanensis Tian, 1988

References

Laelapidae